

The Theban Cycle is a collection of four lost epics of ancient Greek literature which tells the mythological history of the Boeotian city of Thebes. They were composed in dactylic hexameter verse and believed to be recorded between 750 and 500 BC. The epics took place before the Trojan War and centered around the Theban royal family.

The epics of the Theban Cycle were the Oedipodea, the Thebaid, the Epigoni, and the Alcmeonis.

Overview 
In the collection, the precise sequence of events and the handling of characters and plots are difficult to reconstruct. To say the least, there are very few fragments for the Oedipodea and the Epigoni which there are less than ten and only three verbatim fragments totaling four lines. In addition, unlike the poetry of the Trojan cycle, there is no prose summary.

 The Oedipodea: There are a total of 6,600 verses in which different sources attribute Cinaethon of Sparta to this lost epic. It is treated as the opening poem of the Theban Cycle.
 The Thebaid: contain 7,000 verses, also known as Thebais or the Cyclic Thebaid. It is an ancient Greek epic whose author's true identity cannot be determined. Ancient Greek elegiac poet Callinus believed that Homer is the author of the epic, and this statement is widely recognized.
 The Epigoni: consists of 7,000 lines of verse. Some scholars believed it is a sort of sequel to the Thebais. The poem was attributed to Homer, but doubts existed. There is another saying that Antimachus of Teos is the author. The poem raises many unresolved issues concerning its origin, age, arrangement, and relationship with other epics includes Thebaid, Alcmeonis, Trojan that are now lost.
 The Alcmeonis: It is the fourth epic in the Theban Cycle with the least information that existed. The author, verses, and even the written period are unknown.

Plot summary

Oedipodea 

It related to the story of Oedipus and the Sphinx, Oedipus was the king of Thebes in Greek mythology, while the Sphinx was a treacherous and cruel female evil creature in Greek mythology.

One of the two fragments of Oedipodeia in the epic cluster mentions the sphinx. From the existing fragments, it cannot be sure whether the sphinx set riddle. 

The fragment also shows that after Epicaste died, Oedipus remarried. Nevertheless, the four children were born by Epicaste rather than the result of incest.

Thebaid 

As a chronicle, it records the quarrel between the two brothers Eteocles and Polynices, sons of Oedipus, which led to the war of the Seven against Thebes.

When Oedipus gave up the throne in Thebes, his sons Eteocles and Polynices reached an agreement on the inheritance of his father; Polynices took possession of the material property while Eteocles claimed the title of the royal family. Later, the exiled Polynices and Tydeus arrived at Argos at the same time and a fight breaks out. Adrastus, king of Argos, predicted that his daughter would marry a lion and a wild boar, which represents Polynices and Tydeus. To help Polynices regain the throne, Adrastus sent troops to assist him. However, Polynices and six other commanders failed in their expedition to Thebes. At the end of the poem, both Eteocles and Polynices were killed.

Epigoni 

The Epigoni was closely related to the Thebaid because it focused on the second expedition to Thebes by the sons of the Seven after 10 years. In other words, it centered on the family of Oedipus, especially the generation of grandsons. The sons of the seven warriors were unsuccessful in surrounding Thebes. Instead, Epigones captured the city and destroyed it.

There was an extremely limited fragment in the poem. In fact, only the first line is known: "But now, Muses, let us begin on the younger men."

Alcmeonis 

Only seven records of Alcmeonis are found in ancient literature. It tells the story of Alcmaeon killing his mother, Eriphyle, because she arranged for the death of his father Amphiaraus, whose murder is told in Thebaid.

There is a lot of debate about whether to include the Alcmeonis in the epic cycle. However, Alcmaeon is an outstanding figure within the Theban saga. He is the son of Amphiaraus. His father was one of the seven people who failed the attack on Thebes (related to the Thebaid), and he himself was one of Epigonoi (the son of seven people) who destroyed Thebes in the subsequent campaign. The legend of Alcmaeon corresponds to the theme of the Ancient Greek epic.

Significance and influence 
The collection of four lost epics along with other ancient Greek literature influenced literature creation afterward.

A series of famous examples is the Theban play created by Sophocles, one of three ancient Greek tragedians. In particular, the plot of Oedipus Rex, one of the representative works in the Greek tragedy, includes that the protagonist Oedipus defeated the Sphinx by solving puzzles. Oedipus gradually established an image of superior intelligence. The Oedipodea may be a reference for the Oedipus Rex. The evolution of the image of Oedipus and Sphinx also reflects the face of Greek society at that time. To say, in the era of tragedy, civil society may put forward higher demands on the knowledge of the king rather than the force. Therefore, the Oedipus portrayed by Sophocles is an image that relies on knowledge and reasoning.

Later, Sophocles created Epigoni again in the form of tragedy. Unfortunately, the complete script has been lost for centuries and only a few fragments remain.

Last but not least, The Thebaid is associated with another Latin epic with the same title. The Latin poem was also written in dactylic hexameter and described the struggle of the Polynices and Eteocles for the throne of Thebes. Despite being criticized that there is a feeling of exaggeration, it receives popularity in the Middle Ages and Renaissance and helps the promotion of further literature creation.

Modern adaptation 
The epics of the Theban Cycle were converted into plays in ancient Greece. The drama was produced in contemporary world.

 Theban Cycle (2002) presented by the Düsseldorf Schauspielhaus. It is a production of four interconnected Greek plays: The Bacchae by Euripides, Oedipus Rex by Sophocles, Seven Against Thebes by Aeschylus, and Antigone by Sophocles.

Select editions and translations

Critical editions
 .
 .
 .
 .

Translations
 . Greek text with facing English translation

References

Bibliography
 Baumann, R. (n.d.). Photios, Bibliotheca, 239: Proclus' "Grammatical Chrestomathy". Retrieved December 18, 2020, from https://ryanfb.github.io/photios-bibliotheca/239
Cingano, E. (2015). Epigonoi. In M. Fantuzzi & C. Tsagalis (Eds.), The Greek Epic Cycle and its Ancient Reception: A Companion (pp. 244–260). Cambridge: Cambridge University Press. 
Cingano, E. (2015). Oedipodea. In M. Fantuzzi & C. Tsagalis (Eds.), The Greek Epic Cycle and its Ancient Reception: A Companion (pp. 213–225). Cambridge: Cambridge University Press. 
Debiasi, A. (2015). Alcmeonis. In M. Fantuzzi & C. Tsagalis (Eds.), The Greek Epic Cycle and its Ancient Reception: A Companion (pp. 261–280). Cambridge: Cambridge University Press. 
Jeffrey Henderson. (2003, January 1). Greek Epic Fragments. The Theban Cycle. Retrieved December 18, 2020, from https://www.loebclassics.com/search?q=theban+cycle
Malcolm, D. (2015). The Theban Epics. Chapter 4. Epigoni. Hellenic Studies Series 69. Washington, DC: Center for Hellenic Studies. Retrieved December 18, 2020, from https://chs.harvard.edu/CHS/article/display/5910.4-epigoni\
The Editors of Encyclopaedia Britannica. (2020, February 1). Statius. Retrieved December 18, 2020, from https://www.britannica.com/biography/Statius
Torres-Guerra, J. (2015). Thebaid. In M. Fantuzzi & C. Tsagalis (Eds.), The Greek Epic Cycle and its Ancient Reception: A Companion (pp. 226–243). Cambridge: Cambridge University Press. 
West, M.L. (2003), Greek Epic Fragments, Loeb Classical Library, no. 497, Cambridge, MA, .

 
8th-century BC books
7th-century BC books
6th-century BC books
Lost poems